Biseulsan (비슬산) is a mountain of Gyeongsangbuk-do, eastern South Korea. It has an elevation of 1,084 metres.

See also
List of mountains of Korea

References

Mountains of North Gyeongsang Province
Mountains of Daegu
Dalseong County
Cheongdo County
Mountains of South Korea
One-thousanders of South Korea